"I Care 4 U" is a song recorded by American singer Aaliyah. Written by Missy Elliott and Timbaland, the song was originally recorded for Aaliyah's second studio album One in a Million (1996), but the recording was shelved. It was re-recorded in 2000 for Aaliyah (2001). A neo soul ballad, "I Care 4 U" features beatboxing, an electric piano and multi-tracked vocals.

Following Aaliyah's death on August 25, 2001, "I Care 4 U" received heavy airplay in the United States despite not having been released as a single. It peaked at number 16 on the US Billboard Hot 100. The song was then included on Aaliyah's posthumous compilation album I Care 4 U (2002) and was released as its third single on April 8, 2003.

Writing and recording 
"I Care 4 U" was written by Missy Elliott and Timbaland, and was produced by the latter. Aaliyah originally recorded the song for her second studio album One in a Million (1996), but it was completed after the album had finished post-production, and she chose to save it for her next album. In 2000, the song was re-recorded for Aaliyah at Magic Mix Studios and Music Grinder Studios in Los Angeles.

Music and lyrics
Musically, "I Care 4 U" is a neo soul ballad which has been compared to the work of singer Angie Stone. The song includes an initially-uncredited sample of "(Too Little in Common to Be Lovers) Too Much Going to Say Goodbye" by The Newcomers. It features beatboxing, an electric piano and multi-tracked vocals. Michael Odell from The Guardian called the song "the sort of 1970s style ballad that Aaliyah's aunt, Gladys Knight, would approve of – but again it's stripped down and rebuilt with layers of haunting keyboard and lo-tech vocal percussion".

According to Bob Waliszewski from Plugged In, the song "offers support to a guy stinging from a breakup". Graham Smith from musicOMH described "I Care 4 U" as a soft, romantic R&B ballad. According to Aaliyah, the song speaks about a female narrator who tells her male friend: "Don't cry, I'll wipe your tears. I love you, just give me the chance to show you."

Release
Despite receiving heavy airplay in 2002, "I Care 4 U" was never officially serviced to radio stations in the United States. However, it was released as a double A-side single with "Don't Worry" on April 8, 2003, as the second US single from I Care 4 U, by Blackground Records and Universal Records.

In August 2021, it was reported that Aaliyah's recorded work for Blackground (since rebranded as Blackground Records 2.0) would be re-released on physical, digital, and, for the first time ever, streaming services in a deal between the label and Empire Distribution. Aaliyah, including "I Care 4 U", was re-released on September 10.

Critical reception
Ross Scarano from Complex praised the production of "I Care 4 U", comparing it to the work of Angie Stone. He stated: "If it weren't from some low-in-the-mix beatboxing and complicated drum programming, "I Care 4 U" wouldn't register as a Timbaland production. The electric piano and extremely earnest multi-tracked vocals give off the sheen of neo-soul; this is Aaliyah doing Angie Stone". Luke McManus from the Irish publication RTÉ felt that Aaliyah showcased her voice more on the song and that her newfound vocal ability matched the "brilliance of the backing tracks".

Daryl Easlea from BBC praised Aaliyah's vocal performance, saying the song "would be a conventional ballad on a more obvious soul star's album. It's what Aaliyah doesn't do that make it still sound stunning – it would have been so easy to over-ladle the emoting here". Michael Odell from The Guardian praised the song and compared it to the work of Gladys Knight. Russell Baillie from The New Zealand Herald described the song as "soul-sass" and felt that "Aaliyah's voice weaves through the sparse but punchy arrangements with a mix of sultriness". Billboard, felt that "I Care 4 U" was different from other songs that had released, yet Aaliyah "demonstrates the ease with which she can slip into a neo-soul ballad – with just enough production eccentricities to establish that Timb is indeed behind the boards".

Commercial performance 
In the United States, "I Care 4 U" debuted at number 75 on the Hot R&B/Hip-Hop Songs due to heavy airplay on June 1, 2002, despite not having been released as a single yet. It peaked at number three on the chart dated September 28, spending a total of 44 weeks charting. On the Billboard Hot 100, the song peaked at number 16 on October 26; it spent a total of 20 weeks on the chart. "I Care 4 U" also charted for 20 weeks on the Radio Songs chart, peaking at number 15. Along with "Rock the Boat" and "More Than a Woman", the song helped give Aaliyah a strong presence on the radio following her August 25, 2001 death.

Track listing 
US 12-inch vinyl
 "I Care 4 U" (album version) – 4:34
 "Don't Worry" – 3:55

Credits and personnel 
Credits are adapted from the liner notes of Aaliyah.

 Aaliyah – vocals
 Homer Banks – writing
 Jimmy Douglass – engineering, mixing
 Missy Elliott – writing
 Bernie Grundman – mastering
 Carl Hampton – writing
 Timbaland – production, writing

Charts

Weekly charts

Year-end charts

Release history

Notes

References

Bibliography

External links
 Official website

2001 songs
2002 songs
2003 singles
Aaliyah songs
Contemporary R&B ballads
Soul ballads
Song recordings produced by Timbaland
Songs written by Missy Elliott
Songs written by Timbaland
2000s ballads
Neo soul songs